Robert Graham may refer to:

People
Sir Robert Graham (died 1437), one of the assassins of James I of Scotland
Robert Graham (colonel) (died 1701), colonel and Trappist monk
Robert Cunninghame Graham of Gartmore (1735–1797), Scottish politician and poet
Robert Graham (judge) (1744–1836), English judge and privy counsellor
Robert Graham (botanist) (1786–1845), chair of botany at the University of Edinburgh and Regius Keeper of the Royal Botanic Garden Edinburgh
Robert Graham (footballer, born 1884) (1884–1916), Scottish footballer
Robert Graham (footballer, born 1882) (1882–?), Scottish footballer
Robert Graham (Whig politician) (1785–1859), Scottish advocate
Robert Graham (New Zealand politician) (1820–1885), New Zealand politician
Robert Graham (Wisconsin politician) (1827–1892), educator
Robert George Graham (1845–1922), English football player and administrator
Robert Bontine Cunninghame Graham (1852–1936), Scottish politician, writer, journalist and adventurer
Robert Graham (cricketer) (1877–1946), South African cricketer
Robert M. Graham (Wisconsin politician) (1897–1981), American politician
Robert Klark Graham (1906–1997), American eugenicist, businessman, and founder of the Repository for Germinal Choice
Robert A. Graham (1912–1997), American Jesuit priest and historian of the Vatican during the Second World War
Robert M. Graham (computer scientist) (1929–2020), American computer scientist
Robert Graham (sculptor) (1938–2008), American sculptor
Robert Graham (physicist) (born 1942), German theoretical physicist
Robert M. Graham (cardiologist) (born 1948), Australian-born cardiologist
Robert Graham, pen name used by Joe Haldeman
Robert Graham (historian) (born 1958), anarchist historian
Robert Graham (Arizona politician) (born 1972), businessman and Republican Party organizer
Robert Graham (sailor) (1841–1919), American Civil War sailor and Medal of Honor recipient
Robert S. Graham (American football) (1881–1967), American football player and coach
Robert Graham of Fintry, patron of poet Robert Burns
Robert James Douglas Graham, Scottish botanist

Other
Robert Graham (fashion brand), New York-based fashion brand

See also
Bob Graham (disambiguation)
Rob Graham, musician with Drenge (band)

Graham baronets